The 1994 World Series was the scheduled championship series of Major League Baseball's (MLB) 1994 season. It was canceled due to a strike by the MLB Players Association. The cancelation marked the second time a World Series was not played in a given season and the first since 1904.

Canceled playoffs

This was to have been the first year of an expanded eight-team playoff system, with the American League (AL) and National League (NL) realigning into three divisions each (East, Central, and West) at the start of the 1994 season, and the addition of a wild card spot in each league. The NL champion was then supposed to be assigned home-field advantage in 1994 World Series, based on an annual rotation dating back to the mid-1930s in which the World Series opened in the NL city in even-numbered years and opened in the AL city in odd-numbered years. With the postseason canceled, the new playoff system did not go into effect until the 1995 postseason, and the annual World Series rotation was then reversed so that home-field advantage for the 1995 World Series was assigned to the NL champion.

Atlanta Braves' run of division titles
At the time that the strike began, the Montreal Expos had a six game lead in the NL East over the Atlanta Braves, while the Braves had a 2 game lead over the Houston Astros for the NL wild card. As there were no division champions in 1994, the Braves are officially credited with winning 14 consecutive division titles from 1991 to 2005, winning the NL West in the final three years of the two–division system and then winning 11 consecutive NL East titles from 1995 to 2005.

Individual awards

Although the season ended abruptly, individual awards were still given, with Frank Thomas and Jeff Bagwell as league MVPs; David Cone and Greg Maddux as league Cy Young Award winners; and Bob Hamelin and Raúl Mondesí as league Rookie of the Year winners, each in the American League and National League, respectively.

The Baseball Writers' Association of America named managers of the year, which went to Buck Showalter of the New York Yankees and Felipe Alou of the Montreal Expos, whose teams had the best record in each league when the season ended. Alou was additionally selected as manager of the year by the Associated Press, with Showalter finishing second. As All-Star Game managers are, by tradition, the managers of the previous year's league champions, Alou and Showalter were given the honor of managing in the 1995 All-Star Game.

Television coverage

1994 was the first season that national telecasts were produced by The Baseball Network, a joint venture between MLB, ABC, and NBC. Under the original arrangement, ABC would have broadcast the World Series in even-numbered years (included 1994) and NBC would have televised the series in odd-numbered years. Because this 1994 series was cancelled, ABC and NBC shared broadcast rights to the 1995 World Series, after which the joint venture was ended.

See also
2020 NCAA Division I men's basketball tournament 
1994 Japan Series

References

Further reading
The Year There Was No World Series, The Washington Post
Baseball players strike against proposed salary cap 
Frequently Asked Questions About the 1994 Strike 

World Series
World Series
Major League Baseball labor relations
Cancelled baseball competitions
1994 in American sports